Toby Rudolf (born 29 January 1996) is an Australian professional rugby league footballer who plays as a  and  for the Cronulla-Sutherland Sharks in the NRL.

Background
Rudolf is of German descent.

About sexuality he said: "Sexuality is very fluid. I’ve been out and kissed many gay men, kissed many straight women, and kissed many gay women"...I’m not a one-stop shop. Love is love, and I love to share it with everyone. That’s probably why I love going to all the gay bars in Sydney as well. I love dancing with my shirt off and getting down Universal on Oxford Street until 2 a.m.".

Playing career

2018
A South Eastern Seagulls junior, Rudolf began his playing career in South Sydney's Under 20s side before graduating to the club's then feeder side North Sydney.  Rudolf played one season for Norths in the Canterbury Cup NSW before signing with Queensland Cup side Redcliffe Dolphins for 2018.  Rudolf was part of the Redcliffe side which won the 2018 premiership.

2019
After being noticed by Cronulla-Sutherland, Rudolf signed a two-year deal with the club starting in 2019.  Rudolf spent the entirety of 2019 playing for Cronulla's feeder club side Newtown where he won the 2019 Canterbury Cup NSW premiership and the 2019 NRL State Championship final.

2020
Rudolf made his NRL debut in round 1 of the 2020 NRL season for Cronulla-Sutherland against South Sydney at ANZ Stadium.

In round 18 of the 2020 NRL season, Rudolf scored his first try in the top grade in Cronulla's 22-14 victory over the New Zealand Warriors at Kogarah Oval.  The victory meant Cronulla qualified for the finals at New Zealand's expense.

2021
In round 20 of the 2021 NRL season, Rudolf was sent to the sin bin for headbutting an opponent during Cronulla's 22-40 loss against rivals Manly in the "Battle of the Beaches" match.
Rudolf played every game for Cronulla in the 2021 NRL season which saw the club narrowly miss the finals by finishing 9th on the table.

2022
On 15 August, Rudolf was ruled out from playing for four weeks with a grade two medial ligament tear.
Rudolf played a total of 22 games for Cronulla in the 2022 NRL season as the club finished second on the table.  In the qualifying final, Rudolf scored a memorable individual try as he beat five North Queensland players to the try line.  North Queensland would go on to win the match 32-30.  Rudolf played the following week in the elimination final which Cronulla lost 38-12 against South Sydney.

Statistics

NRL
 Statistics are correct as of the end of the 2022 season

Controversy
In 2021, he came to national attention after being reprimanded for an inappropriate interview following his team Cronulla-Sutherland defeating rivals St. George.

Rudolf spoke with Fox Sports following the victory and was asked how he would celebrate.  Rudolf jokingly replied “1000 beers, then heading to Northies to try and pull something. Anything will do".

NRL CEO Andrew Abdo labelled the comments “offensive and derogatory” before issuing Cronulla and Rudolf with an official warning.

References

External links

Cronulla-Sutherland Sharks profile

1996 births
Living people
Australian rugby league players
Australian people of German descent
Cronulla-Sutherland Sharks players
North Sydney Bears NSW Cup players
Newtown Jets NSW Cup players
Rugby league players from Sydney
Rugby league props